The Last Ship is an American post-apocalyptic drama television series based on a novel of the same name by William Brinkley. In May 2013, the cable network TNT placed a ten-episode order for the series. The series premiered on June 22, 2014, at 9:00 p.m. EDT.

Series overview

Episodes

Season 1 (2014)

Season 2 (2015)

Season 3 (2016)

Season 4 (2017)

Season 5 (2018)

Ratings

References

External links
 List of The Last Ship episodes  at TNT
 

Lists of American drama television series episodes
The Last Ship (TV series)